The Grammy Award for Best Performance by an Orchestra or Instrumentalist with Orchestra - Primarily Not Jazz or for Dancing was awarded from 1959 to 1964.  The award had several minor name changes: 

From 1959 to 1960 the award was known as Best Performance by an Orchestra
In 1961 it was awarded as Best Performance by an Orchestra - for Other Than Dancing
From 1962 to 1964 it has been awarded as Best Performance by an Orchestra or Instrumentalist with Orchestra - Primarily Not Jazz or for Dancing

This award was presented alongside the award for Best Performance by an Orchestra – for Dancing.

Years reflect the year in which the Grammy Awards were presented, for works released in the previous year.

Recipients

References

Performance by an Orchestra or Instrumentalist with Orchestra